Valeriya Yevgenyevna Tyuleneva (born 27 September 1997) is a Kazakhstani cross-country skier who competes internationally.

She competed for Kazakhstan at the FIS Nordic World Ski Championships 2017 in Lahti, Finland.

Cross-country skiing results
All results are sourced from the International Ski Federation (FIS).

Olympic Games

World Championships

World Cup

Season standings

References 

1997 births
Living people
Kazakhstani female cross-country skiers
Cross-country skiers at the 2018 Winter Olympics
Cross-country skiers at the 2022 Winter Olympics
Olympic cross-country skiers of Kazakhstan
21st-century Kazakhstani women